Natsuki Kishikawa (born 26 April 1991) is a Japanese professional footballer who plays as a midfielder for WE League club JEF United Chiba.

Club career 
Kishikawa made her WE League debut on 20 September 2021.

References 

WE League players
Living people
1991 births
Japanese women's footballers
Women's association football midfielders
Universiade medalists in football
Association football people from Kanagawa Prefecture
Urawa Red Diamonds Ladies players
BV Cloppenburg (women) players
JEF United Chiba Ladies players
Medalists at the 2011 Summer Universiade
Universiade silver medalists for Japan